Acanceh is a town and ancient Maya archaeological site located in Mexico's Yucatán State, 21 kilometers from Mérida, the capital of Yucatán. It is the seat of Acanceh Municipality. The modern town of Acanceh, is partially atop the pre-Columbian site, and occupation seems to have been continuous. Acanceh means "groan of the deer" in the Yucatec Maya language.

The population of Acanceh about, 11,000 people,  is mostly Maya, with the Mayan language predominantly spoken, although basic Spanish is generally understood.

Ancient Acanceh

Acanceh was founded sometime between 300 and 500 AD, during the Early Classic period, possibly by the Itzaes in their first migration from the east to the west of the Yucatán peninsula, having come from the lake area of Bacalar and having founded Chichen Itzá, Izamal and T'Hó (currently Mérida.)

In more recent times, before the arrival of the Spaniards, Acanceh was located within the jurisdiction (Kuchkabal) of the chakanes.

The ancient Maya city covered more than 4 square kilometers, and had about 400 buildings. Three of these buildings have been restored and are open to the public, although recent excavations have uncovered more structures. The three-leveled step pyramid in Acanceh is 11 meters high. One of the older layers of the pyramid has been uncovered revealing several distinctive carved masks as part of the pyramid's decoration. The "Palace of the Stuccos" is 50 meters wide, 6 meters high, and contains many elaborate friezes. This building's design is very complex, with many rooms and detailed carvings. The architecture of the structures at Acanceh show a Teotihuacano influence, leading some to believe it was a "colony" of Teotihuacan.

References 

Maya sites in Yucatán
Populated places in Yucatán
Maya sites that survived the end of the Classic Period